La Laguna Estigia (The River Styx or The Styx), also known simply as Laguna Estigia, is an 1887 Greco-Roman painting by Filipino painter  Félix Resurrección Hidalgo.  It is a companion-piece for Hidalgo's other painting entitled La barca de Aqueronte.  Like the La barca de Aqueronte, the La Laguna Estigia is based on Dante's Inferno, the painter pursuing the theme leading towards a “darker” and “more somber interpretation” of it.  

The painting was a silver medalist during the 1887 Exposicion General de las Islas Filipinas in Madrid, Spain.

References

1887 paintings
Paintings by Félix Resurrección Hidalgo
Maritime paintings
Paintings based on works by Dante Alighieri
Works based on Inferno (Dante)